Body Heat is an album by Quincy Jones.

Track listing 
 "Body Heat" (Quincy Jones, Leon Ware, Bruce Fisher, Stanley "Stan" Richardson) – 3:58
 "Soul Saga (Song of the Buffalo Soldier)" (Ray Brown, Quincy Jones, Tom Bahler, Joseph Greene) – 4:58
 "Everything Must Change" (Benard Ighner) – 6:01 - vocals by Benard Ighner
 "Boogie Joe the Grinder" (Quincy Jones, Dave Grusin, Tom Bahler) – 3:09
 "Everything Must Change (Reprise)" (Benard Ighner) – 1:01
 "One Track Mind" (Quincy Jones, Leon Ware) – 6:14
 "Just a Man" (Valdy) – 3:31
 "Along Came Betty" (Benny Golson) – 4:47
 "If I Ever Lose This Heaven" (Leon Ware, Pam Sawyer) – 4:52 - vocals by Leon Ware & Minnie Riperton

Personnel 
 Quincy Jones - Arranger, Composer, Producer, Trumpet, Vocals
 Dave Grusin - Composer, Drums, Electric Piano, Synthesizer
 Herbie Hancock - Piano, Electric Piano, Synthesizer
 Bob James, Richard Tee - Electric Piano
 Larry Dunn, Malcolm Cecil, Robert Margouleff, Mike Melvoin - Synthesizer
 Wah Wah Watson, Phil Upchurch, David T. Walker, Arthur Adams, Dennis Coffey, Eric Gale - Guitar
 Grady Tate, Paul Humphrey, Bernard Purdie, James Gadson - Drums
 Max Bennett, Chuck Rainey, Melvin Dunlap - Bass
 Hubert Laws (Flute), Frank Rosolino (Trombone), Clifford Solomon, Chuck Findley (Trumpets), Jerome Richardson, Pete Christlieb (Saxophones)
 Tommy Morgan - Harmonica
 Billy Preston - Organ
 Bobbye Hall - Percussion
 Leon Ware, Minnie Riperton, Myrna Matthews, Al Jarreau, Jesse Kirkland, Carolyn Willis, Benard Ighner, Bruce Fisher, Jim Gilstrap, Joseph Greene, Tom Bahler - Vocals

Charts 
Body Heat was Quincy Jones' highest-charting album on the Billboard 200, peaking at number six.

Singles

Certifications

Samples 
 "Body Heat"
 "How Do U Want It" by 2Pac on All Eyez on Me
 "Temperature's Rising" by Mobb Deep on The Infamous

 "If I Ever Lose This Heaven"
 "Foolin'" by De La Soul on Art Official Intelligence: Mosaic Thump (2000)
 "Too Old For Me" by Jerome on Bad Boy Greatest Hits, Volume 1 (1998)
 "Nobody Sound Like Me" by Xzibit feat. Montage One on 40 Dayz & 40 Nightz (1998)

See also
List of Billboard number-one R&B albums of 1974

References 

1974 albums
Quincy Jones albums
Albums produced by Quincy Jones
Albums arranged by Quincy Jones
A&M Records albums